Strange Advance is a Canadian new wave band formed in 1982 in Vancouver, British Columbia. They were nominated for a 1983 Juno Award as Most Promising Group of the Year and again in 1985 as Group of the Year. Their first two albums, 1982's Worlds Away and 1985's 2WO, were Canadian gold selling records.

History

1982–1995: Formation and Canadian popularity
Strange Advance was initially made up of Drew Arnott (keyboards, percussion, vocals), Darryl Kromm (lead vocals, guitars), and Paul Iverson (bass). The three met in Vancouver and founded the group in 1980. Initially called Metropolis, they changed their name after discovering a band in Germany using "Metropolis".

The group's first album, Worlds Away featured the title track, "Worlds Away", which saw modest airplay in North American markets in 1983.  The album was produced by Bruce Fairbairn, known for his work with Loverboy and Prism, but featured a very different sound from those groups. Rather than commercial hard rock, Strange Advance's music was a fusion of progressive rock and new wave, with a heavy reliance on synthesizers and keyboards.

Iverson left the group after the first album and was not replaced. The group's 1985 album 2WO also went gold in Canada and was produced by Arnott, using an extensive array of session players, and brought the band their first big Canadian hit with "We Run". Strange Advance had never played a live gig prior to 1985, so Arnott and Kromm added musicians Ric deGroot (keyboards), Ian Cameron (guitar, violin), Joey Alvero (bass) and David Quinton (drums) to the line-up as session players, and supported the first two albums with a tour of Eastern Canada.

Strange Advance's third album, 1988's The Distance Between also used well-known session musicians (including Randy Bachman and Allan Holdsworth), and produced the top 20 single "Love Becomes Electric". Following this album's release, the group became essentially inactive. Arnott stated in 2021 that other music genres such as grunge were gaining popularity, and he wasn't interested in changing the group's sound.

In 1995, the Strange Advance compilation album Worlds Away & Back featured a mix of previously released material, outtakes, remixes, demos, and three newly recorded tracks—one from 1991, and two from 1995.

2016–present: Remastering and reunion
On 24 June 2016, The Distance Between was remastered and re-released on CD with two bonus tracks, an extended club mix of "Love Becomes Electric" and the previously unreleased song, "Flow My Tears".

In December 2018, Worlds Away was remastered and re-released on CD with two bonus tracks, the UK Dance Mix of "Love Games" (transferred from vinyl) and the b-side to "She Controls Me" – "Lost in Your Eyes". This marked the first time their debut has seen a CD release of any kind, despite the albums' popularity. This release is only available in the Philippines, on the Sound Philosophy label, which is a new boutique label for titles not released on CD. This version appears to be sourced from the master tapes.

On 17 September 2018, Drew Arnott announced a crowdfunding campaign on Facebook to finance a summer 2019 Strange Advance reunion tour. The fundraising was successful, and the band (minus Kromm) planned to perform in 2019 for the Radical Orbits Tour. Unfortunately, due to cancellations and delays, the tour was rescheduled to 2021.

Discography

Studio albums
Worlds Away (1982)
2WO (1985)
The Distance Between (1988)
4 (2021)

Compilation albums
Over 60 Minutes with... Strange Advance (1987)
Worlds Away & Back (1995)

Music video compilations
Strange Advance (1985)

Singles

See also

List of bands from Canada
List of bands from British Columbia

References

External links
 
 
 

1982 establishments in British Columbia
1995 disestablishments in British Columbia
Canadian new wave musical groups
Canadian synthpop groups
Capitol Records artists
Musical groups established in 1982
Musical groups disestablished in 1995
Musical groups from Vancouver
Musical groups reestablished in 2019